Michael Richard Parisi (born April 18, 1983 in Huntington, New York) is a former right-handed professional baseball pitcher. Parisi had a short-lived career in professional baseball as a right-handed pitcher. His career came to ahead after he completely blew the game for the St. Louis Cardinals against the Boston Red Sox. The game was the end to his career.

Parisi is the second Major League Baseball player to hail from Sachem High School in Lake Ronkonkoma, New York on Long Island. However, Mike Parisi was described as subpar several times throughout his career in multiple sources including The Bleacher Report.

Amateur career
Parisi went to Manhattan College and was a pitcher for the Jaspers under head coach Steve Trimper. In 2002, he played collegiate summer baseball with the Wareham Gatemen of the Cape Cod Baseball League.

Professional career

St. Louis Cardinals
He was drafted in the 9th round of the 2004 MLB draft by the St. Louis Cardinals. On November 20, 2007, Parisi was added to the Cardinals 40-man roster in order to keep him from being lost in the Rule 5 draft. On May 4, 2008, Parisi was called up to the big-league club. Parisi made his MLB debut on May 5, 2008 at Coors Field against the Colorado Rockies. He pitched a scoreless inning of relief and his first career strikeout was against Matt Herges. He pitched in a total of 12 games for the Cardinals in 2008, with 2 starts. His ERA was 8.22 and he had 13 strikeouts and 15 walks. On November 20, 2008, the Cardinals outrighted him to its AAA affiliate (Memphis Redbirds).

Chicago Cubs
On December 10, 2009, the Chicago Cubs selected Parisi from the Cardinals in the Rule 5 draft. He played in the Cubs minor league system of the Cubs in 2010 for the Tennessee Smokies and the Iowa Cubs. He was released by the Cubs on March 23, 2011.

Long Island Ducks
He signed with the Long Island Ducks shortly afterwards. For the Ducks he posted a 6-4 record while posting a 3.50 ERA. He was one of seven Ducks who were selected to the 2011 Atlantic League All-Star Game. During the middle of the 2011 season, he was picked up by the Los Angeles Dodgers and assigned to the Albuquerque Isotopes soon after.

Los Angeles Dodgers
His contract was purchased by the Los Angeles Dodgers on July 19, 2011 and he was assigned to the AAA Albuquerque Isotopes. He made 9 starts for Albuquerque, with a 6-2 record and 5.20 ERA. In 2012, he also made 9 starts for the Isotopes and was 1-1 with a 2.72 ERA. He left a game on May 28 due to shoulder pain  and spent the rest of the season on the disabled list.

Bridgeport Bluefish
Parisi pitched for the Bridgeport Bluefish of the Atlantic League of Professional Baseball in 2013.

References

External links

 Sachem.Patch.com feature about Parisi and his Sachem roots
 Daily Record article
 Manhattan College article on his signing with the Cardinals
 Baseball Prospectus stats and predictions
 Parisi player profile at Scout.com

1983 births
Living people
Albuquerque Isotopes players
Baseball players from New York (state)
Bravos de Margarita players
Bridgeport Bluefish players
Gulf Coast Cardinals players
Iowa Cubs players
Long Island Ducks players
Major League Baseball pitchers
Manhattan Jaspers baseball players
Memphis Redbirds players
New Jersey Cardinals players
Palm Beach Cardinals players
People from Huntington, New York
People from Lake Ronkonkoma, New York
Peoria Chiefs players
Peoria Saguaros players
Springfield Cardinals players
St. Louis Cardinals players
Surprise Saguaros players
Swing of the Quad Cities players
Tennessee Smokies players
Wareham Gatemen players